Koraput (Sl. No.: 144) is a Vidhan Sabha constituency of Koraput district, Odisha, India.

The constituency includes Koraput, Sunabeda Lamptaput block, 15 Gram panchayats (Badasuku, Deoghati, Kendar, Kerenga, Lankaput, Mahadeiput, Manbar, Mastiput, Padmapur and Umuri) of Koraput block and 8 Gram panchayats (Bodaput, Boipariguda, Chandrapada, Chipakur, Dasamanthapur, Doraguda, Kenduguda, Kollar and Mahuli) of Boipariguda block.

Elected members

Sixteen elections were held between 1951 and 2019.Elected members from the Koraput constituency are:
2019: (144): Shri Raghuram Padal(BJD)
2014: (144): Krushna Chandra Sagaria Congress
2009: (144): Raghuram Padal(BJD)
2004: (85): Tara Prasad Bahinipati (Congress)
2000: (85): Tara Prasad Bahinipati (Congress)
1995: (85): Gupta Prasad Das (Congress)
1990: (85): Harish Chandra Buxipatra (Janata Dal)
1985: (85): Nrusingha Nanda Brahma (Congress)
1980: (85): Nrusingha Nanda Brahma (Congress-I)
1977: (85): Harish Chandra Buxipatra (Janata Party)
1974: (85): Harish Chandra Buxipatra (Utkal Congress)
1961: (8): Toyaka Sangana (Congress)
1957: (6): Lachhaman Pujhari (Ganatantra Parishad)
 1951: (5): Ganga Muduli (Ganatantra Parishad)

Election results

2019

2014
In 2014 election, Indian National Congress candidate Krushna Chandra Sagaria defeated Biju Janata Dal candidate Raghuram Machha by a margin of 4,976 votes.

2009
In the 2009 election, Biju Janata Dal candidate Raghuram Padal defeated Indian National Congress candidate Krishna Chandra Sagaria by a margin of 1,114 votes.

Notes

References

Assembly constituencies of Odisha
Koraput district